Francis Martin Baillie Reynolds  (born 11 November 1932) is an emeritus professor of law at the University of Oxford and an honorary Fellow of Worcester College, Oxford. He is also a Fellow of the British Academy, an Honorary Queen's Counsel and an Honorary Bencher of the Inner Temple.

Reynolds was educated at Winchester and Worcester College, Oxford, and was admitted to the Bar of the Inner Temple.

He specialises in international commercial law – international sales, carriage by sea, parts of the conflict of laws and the law of agency. He is the standing editor of Bowstead and Reynolds on Agency and was the editor-in-chief of the Law Quarterly Review. Reynolds is also a contributing editor to Carver on Bills of Lading and Benjamin's Sale of Goods.

References 

English legal scholars
English King's Counsel
Fellows of the British Academy
Fellows of Worcester College, Oxford
1932 births
Living people
Members of the Inner Temple
Alumni of Worcester College, Oxford
People educated at Winchester College
Conflict of laws scholars